The 1924 Maine Black Bears football team was an American football team that represented the University of Maine as a member of the New England Conference during the 1924 college football season. In its fourth season under head coach Fred Brice, the team compiled a 4–3–1 record (1–2 against conference opponents) and played its home games at Alumni Field in Orono, Maine. George Gruhn was the team captain.

Schedule

References

Maine
Maine Black Bears football seasons
Maine Black Bears football